Feodosiyite is a very rare chloride mineral, just recently approved, with the formula Cu11Mg2Cl18(OH)8•16H2O. Its structure is unique. Feodosiyite comes from the Tolbachik volcano, famous for many rare fumarolic minerals. Chemically similar minerals, chlorides containing both copper and magnesium, include haydeeite, paratacamite-(Mg) and tondiite.

References

Halide minerals
Copper(II) minerals
Magnesium minerals
Monoclinic minerals
Minerals in space group 14